The Strange Boarders of Palace Crescent is a thriller novel by the British writer Edward Phillips Oppenheim, which was first published in 1934. It is set in a boarding house in London.

Film adaptation
In 1938 the story provided a loose basis for the comedy-thriller film Strange Boarders made by Gainsborough Pictures and starring Tom Walls, Renée Saint-Cyr and Googie Withers.

References

Bibliography
 Goble, Alan. The Complete Index to Literary Sources in Film. Walter de Gruyter, 1999.

1934 British novels
British thriller novels
Novels by E. Phillips Oppenheim
British novels adapted into films
Novels set in London
Hodder & Stoughton books
Little, Brown and Company books